Savva Yakovlevich Kulish (17 October 1936 – 9 June 2001) was a Soviet film director and screenwriter. He directed eight films between 1966 and 1994. His 1979 film Takeoff won the Silver Prize at the 11th Moscow International Film Festival. He was awarded with the People's Artist of Russia in 1995.

Selected filmography
 Dead Season (1968) — director
 Takeoff (1979) — director
 Fairy tales... fairy tales... fairy tales of the old Arbat (1982) — director, screenwriter
 Fouetté (1986) — screenwriter
 Tragedy, Rock Style (1988) — director, screenwriter
 Stalin's Funeral (1990) — actor

References

External links

1936 births
2001 deaths
Soviet film directors
Soviet screenwriters
Russian film directors
Male screenwriters
Film people from Odesa
People's Artists of Russia
Burials in Troyekurovskoye Cemetery
20th-century Russian screenwriters
20th-century Russian male writers